Timothy Usasz (born 21 June 1983) is a retired Australian-born American international rugby union player who played domestically for Nottingham as a scrum-half.

Career
His debut for the USA Eagles XV was against Ireland at Santa Clara on 31 May 2009. He was a member of the USA squad that played in the 2011 World Cup in New Zealand. During the World Cup he was made captain for the USA's game against the team of his birth, the Australian Wallabies.

Usasz retired from rugby in April 2012.

References

External links

1983 births
Living people
Rugby union scrum-halves
American rugby union players
United States international rugby union players
Nottingham R.F.C. players
Australian emigrants to the United States
American expatriate rugby union players
Expatriate rugby union players in England
Rugby union players from Brisbane
Expatriate rugby union players in Hong Kong
American expatriate sportspeople in Hong Kong
American expatriate sportspeople in England